Crashing Dream is the second and final album by American paisley underground band Rain Parade, released in 1985 by record label Island.

Track listing
 "Depending On You" – 3:33
 "My Secret Country" – 3:17
 "Don't Feel Bad" – 3:20
 "Mystic Green" – 3:49
 "Sad Eyes Kill" – 3:13
 "Shoot Down The Railroad Man" – 3:23
 "Fertile Crescent" – 3:38
 "Invisible People" – 3:05
 "Gone West" – 3:44
 "Only Business" – 1;45

Personnel
Rain Parade
Matt Piucci – vocals, guitar, sitar
Steven Roback – vocals, bass
Will Glenn – keyboards
Mark Marcum - drums
John Thoman - guitar, vocals

Critical reception 
Writing in Trouser Press, reviewers held forth praise for just one song ("Depending on You") and remarked that "the album is attractive but flimsy — competent technique in search of a spine and a direction. In other words, it sounds like the work of a band on the verge of breaking up — which, in fact, Rain Parade did not long after the album's release." In a separate review published in Creem, Ira Robbins described the band's various musical appropriations and concluded that "Rain Parade is all dressed up – in other people's clothes – with no place to go."

References

External links 

 

1985 albums
Rain Parade albums
Island Records albums